Hoon Tari Heer is a 2022 Gujarati-language  film, directed by Dhwani Gautam starring Puja Joshi, Bharat Chawda,  Ojas Rawal and others produced by Sameer Upadhyay, Disha Upadhyay and Dr Jayesh Pavra and distributed by Rupam Entertainment Pvt Ltd.

Plot 
Heer, a small town girl faces taboos in her community to meet her man of dreams. she faces all odds to live a life of her choice and why can't a girl live with her parents like boys do and still be considered as a stranger in her own home.

Cast 
 Puja Joshi
 Bharat Chawda
 Ojas Rawal
 Dharmesh Vyas
 Surabhi Zaveri Vyas
 Nisarg Trivedi
 Sonali Lele Desai
 Mansi Bhadiyadra

Development 
The film has been shoot in Gondal, India, along with the Vilnius Lithuania, Barcelona Spain. This is the first film in Gujarati which got shot in Eastern Europe. Director Dhwani Gautam reveals the first look of the poster in December 2021. and announce the project and begun the India shot. The second schedule of the movie begun in the month of February 2022 in Europe. legendry singer Sairam Dave, Kirtidan Gadhvi, Geeta Rabari, Aishwarya Majmudar Meet Jain, Bhoomi Trivedi, Nakash Aziz, Jigardan Gadhavi has given the voices. The music has been composed by Rahul Munjariya. The teaser of the film released in August 2022 starting and has been appreciated by the audience.  The trailer got released on end of August 2022 and crossed more than a million views. The poster released on starting of September. along with the Dhol Vage song. The film was released on 7 October 2022.

Soundtrack

Tracklist 
The soundtrack of the album is composed by Rahul Munjariya with lyrics written by Bhargav Purohit, Milind Gadhvi, Nandan Purohit, Jigardan Gadhavi, Devraj and Bharat. The soundtrack album consists of nine tracks.

References

External links 
 

2022 films
2020s Gujarati-language films
Films shot in Lithuania
Films shot in Barcelona
Films shot in Gujarat